Landslide (Hungarian: Földindulás) is a 1940 Hungarian drama film directed by Arzén von Cserépy and starring Antal Páger, Olga Eszenyi and Ferenc Kiss. Although ostensibly a romance film, it contained significant amounts of propaganda supportive of the policies of Hungary's far-right government. It was based on a play by János Kodolányi.

Cast

References

Bibliography
 Cunningham, John. Hungarian Cinema: From Coffee House to Multiplex. Wallflower Press, 2004.

External links

1940 films
1940 drama films
Hungarian drama films
1940s Hungarian-language films
Hungarian films based on plays
Films directed by Arzén von Cserépy
Hungarian black-and-white films